Suvorovka is a rural locality (a selo) and the administrative center of Suvorovsky Selsoviet, Blagoveshchensky District, Altai Krai, Russia. The population was 555 as of 2013. It was founded in 1908. There are 6 streets.

Geography 
Suvorovka is located 23 km southeast of Blagoveshchenka (the district's administrative centre) by road. Pregradinka is the nearest rural locality.

References 

Rural localities in Blagoveshchensky District, Altai Krai